Elizabeth Raspolic (1939 – May 26, 2022) was an American diplomat who served as the U.S. Ambassador to Gabon with a concurrent appointment to São Tomé and Principe (1995–1998).  Raspolic was also director of the Interagency Rightsizing Committee.

Raspolic also served as Vice consul; Lyon, France (1974–1976) and Seoul, South Korea (1976–1978); Consul, Addis Ababa, Ethiopia (1978–1980) and Guangzhou, China (PRC) (1983–1986); and Consul general, Beijing (1986–1988).

Raspolic was one of approximately 90 intelligence officials who signed on to an open letter to the Wall Street Journal supporting the whistleblower in the Trump impeachment scandal.

Raspolic died after a brief illness on May 26, 2022.

References

1939 births
2022 deaths
20th-century American diplomats
20th-century American women
21st-century American women
Ambassadors of the United States to Gabon
Ambassadors of the United States to São Tomé and Príncipe
American consuls
American women ambassadors